Young Brown or Abe Brown (born 1893) was an American welterweight boxer.

Young Brown may also refer to:

 Young Goodman Brown, Nathaniel Hawthorne story
 Young Widder Brown, NBC radio drama

See also 
 John Young Brown (disambiguation), several people by the name
 Young Pluto (Joseph William Dudley Brown, 1872–1931), South African boxer
 Young Buck (David Darnell Brown, born 1981), American rapper
 Little, Brown Young Readers, publishing company
 Brown-Young BY-1 airplane
 Young (disambiguation)
 Brown (disambiguation)

Brown, Young